Fergana is a district of Fergana Region in Uzbekistan. The capital lies at the town Chimyon.

The district consists of 21 urban-type settlements (Chimyon, Avval, Archa, Vodil, Yuqori Vodil, Damkoʻl, Yoshlarobod, Qoʻrgʻontepa, Langar, Logʻon, Mindon, Novkent, Yuqori Oqtepa, Parvoz, Yuqori Soyboʻyi, Bahor, Xonqiz, Xoʻroba, Neftchilar, Shoximardonobod, Yuqori Mindon) and 16 rural communities (Avval, Gulshan, Qoʻrgʻontepa, Soy boʻyi, Logʻon, Mindon, Navkat, Qaptarxona, Shohimardon, Parvoz, Chimyon, Damkoʻl, Xonqiz, Oqbilol, Yuqori Vodil, Vodil).

References

Districts of Uzbekistan
Fergana Region
1926 establishments in the Soviet Union